Lorenzo is an Italian and Spanish masculine given name of Latin origin. It is used in Italy, Spain, and other Spanish-speaking countries. The name was derived from the Roman surname Laurentius, which meant "from Laurentum". Laurentum, which is itself named after the laurel tree, was an ancient Roman city of Latium situated between Ostia and Lavinium, on the west coast of the Italian peninsula southwest of Rome.

People with the given name

Films, television, and games
 Lorenzo Caccialanza (born 1955), Italian-born American actor
 Lorenzo Lamas (born 1958), American actor
 Lorenzo Menakaya, Nigerian actor, filmmaker and radio host
 Lorenzo Milá (born 1960), Spanish newscaster
 Lorenzo Milam (1933–2020), American broadcaster
 Lorenzo Music (1937–2001), American actor

Music
 Lorenzo (rapper), French rapper
 Lorenzo Cherubini, aka Jovanotti (born 1966), Italian rapper and songwriter
 Lorenzo da Firenze, Italian composer and music teacher of the trecento
 Lorenzo Da Ponte (1749–1838), Venetian librettist
 Lorenzo Ferrero (born 1951), Italian composer
 Lorenzo Jerald Patterson (born 1969), stage name MC Ren, American rapper and hip hop producer
 Don Lorenzo Perosi (1872–1956), Italian composer
 Lorenzo Smith (born 1972), American singer and songwriter
 Lorenzo Viotti, Swiss conductor

Politics
 Lorenzo II, Duke of Urbino (1492–1519), Italian statesman
 Lorenzo Fontana (born 1980), Italian politician
 Lorenzo de' Medici (1449–1492), Italian statesman
 Lorenzo T. Durand (1849–1917), American politician and lawyer

Sports
 Lorenzo Alexander (born 1983), American football linebacker
Lorenzo Brown (born 1990), basketball player
 Lorenzo Cain (born 1986), American baseball player
 Lorenzo Carter (American football) (born 1995), American football player
 Lorenzo Cittadini (born 1982), Italian rugby union player
 Lorenzo Daniel (born 1966), American track and field sprinter
 Lorenzo Doss (born 1994), American football player
 Lorenzo Duncan (born ), American basketball player
 Lorenzo Fontana (born 1996), Italian rower
 Lorenzo Insigne (born 1991), Italian footballer
 Lorenzo Ma'afu (born 1987), New Zealand rugby league player
 Lorenzo Mata (born 1986), Mexican-American basketball player
 Lorenzo Neal (born 1970), American football player
 Lorenzo Ramírez (born 1985), Mexican footballer
 Lorenzo Romar (born 1958), American basketball coach
 Lorenzo Scarafoni (born 1965), Italian footballer
 Lorenzo Sonego (born 1995), Italian tennis player
 Lorenzo Staelens (born 1964), Belgian footballer
 Lorenzo Ward (born 1967), American football coach
 Lorenzo Washington (1986–2021), American football player

OtherLorenzo 
 Lorenzo Bandini (1935–1967), Italian motor racing driver
 Lorenzo Costa (1460–1535), Italian painter
 Lorenzo Dow (1777–1834), American preacher
 Lorenzo Gafa (1638–1703), Maltese architect
 Lorenzo Ghiberti (1378–1455), Italian artist
 Lorenzo Lotto (1480–1556), Italian painter 
 Lorenzo Maitani (1255–1330), Italian architect
 Lorenzo Mascheroni (1750–1800), Italian mathematician
 Lorenzo Odone (1978–2008), American ALD patient, the first treated with Lorenzo's oil
 Lorenzo Ornaghi (born 1948), Italian academic 
 Lorenzo Ramero, Italian mathematician
 Lorenzo Ruiz (born 1600), first Filipino saint
 Lorenzo Snow (1814–1901), American LDS apostle and church president
 Lorenzo Valla (c. 1407–1457), Italian humanist, rhetorician, and educator
Lorenzo Simmons (Born 1967) American Blogger

People with the surname
 Fiorenzo di Lorenzo (1440–1522), Italian painter
 Frank Lorenzo (born 1940), American airline executive and corporate raider
 Gramiccia Lorenzo (1702–1796), Italian painter
 Irving Lorenzo, aka Irv Gotti (born 1970), American record producer
 Jorge Lorenzo (born 1987), Spanish motorcycle racer
 Ruth Lorenzo (born 1982), Spanish singer and composer
 Santiago Lorenzo (born 1978), Argentine decathlete

Fictional
 Lorenzo, a character from Total Drama Presents: The Ridonculous Race
 Lorenzo Bartolini, a character in the 2010 film Letters to Juliet
 Lorenzo Montereal, character in the Filipino television series Lorenzo's Time
 Lorenzo St. John, a character from TV series The Vampire Diaries
 Lorenzo Zoil, a character in the 2011 film Paul

See also
Lorenza, given name
Lorenzen Wright (1975–2010), American basketball player
Lorenzen (surname)

Italian masculine given names
Spanish masculine given names
Lorenzo Simmons (Born 1967) American